Manzanal del Puerto is a locality and minor local entity located in the municipality of Villagatón, in León province, Castile and León, Spain. As of 2020, it has a population of 62.

Geography 
Manzanal del Puerto is located 74km west of León, Spain.

References

Populated places in the Province of León